Mediodactylus orientalis is a species of lizard in the family Gekkonidae. It is found in Lebanon and Jordan. It is sometimes considered a subspecies of Kotschy's gecko.

The common names of Mediodactylus orientalis (Stepánek, 1937) are Mediterranean thin-toed gecko, Europäischer Nacktfinger and Ägäischer Bogenfinger.

Reproduction 
The reproductive system of this species of lizard is oviparous. It produces young by means of eggs which are hatched after they have been laid by the parent.

References 

Mediodactylus
Reptiles described in 1937